Buckingham Nicks is the only studio album by the duo of American rock guitarist Lindsey Buckingham and singer Stevie Nicks, both of whom later joined Fleetwood Mac. Produced by Keith Olsen, the album was released in September 1973 by Polydor Records. 

The album was a commercial failure on its original release, and despite the duo's subsequent success, it has yet to be commercially remastered or re-released digitally.

Background
Prior to recording the album Buckingham Nicks, Lindsey Buckingham and Stevie Nicks performed together in the band the Fritz Rabyne Memorial Band. The pair met while they were both attending Menlo-Atherton High School in Atherton, California, south of San Francisco. At the time, Nicks was a senior in high school and Buckingham, one year younger than she, was a junior. According to Nicks, they first met at a casual, after-school Young Life gathering in 1966. Nicks and Buckingham found themselves harmonizing to what some accounts claim was a Beach Boys song, although Nicks herself claims they sang "California Dreamin'," a hit single by the Mamas and the Papas, in an interview she gave with The Source in 1981. Nevertheless, Nicks and Buckingham did not collaborate again for another two years. In 1968 Buckingham invited Nicks to sing in Fritz, a band for which he was playing bass guitar and which included some of his high school friends. Nicks talks about joining Fritz in an interview with Us Magazine from 1988:

I met Lindsey when I was a senior in high school and he was a junior, and we sang a song together at some after-school function. Two years later, in 1968, he called me and asked me if I wanted to be in a rock & roll band. I had been playing guitar and singing pretty much totally folk-oriented stuff. So I joined the band, and within a couple of weeks we were opening for really big shows: Jefferson Airplane, Janis Joplin. All of a sudden I was in rock & roll.

Although Nicks and Buckingham never performed their own original music while in Fritz, the band provided them with the opportunity to gain experience on stage, performing in front of crowds while opening for wildly successful rock and roll acts. Grace Slick of Jefferson Airplane, Janis Joplin of Big Brother and the Holding Company and Jimi Hendrix, whom Fritz also opened for, would all prove influential on Nicks and her developing stage persona. The band manager, David Forrester, worked hard to secure a record deal for Fritz, despite their sound differing from the harder, psychedelic music of their more popular contemporaries. The pair continued to perform with Fritz for three years until the band finally dissolved in 1971. Having developed a romantic relationship in addition to their working partnership, Nicks and Buckingham decided soon afterwards to move from San Francisco to Los Angeles to pursue their dreams of being signed.

Recording and production
While still performing with Fritz, Nicks had attended San Jose State University, studying Speech Communication. Buckingham joined her at college, also managing to balance school and music. In 1972, the two continued to write songs, recording demo tapes at night in Daly City on a half-inch four-track Ampex tape machine Buckingham kept at the coffee roasting plant belonging to his father. They decided to drop out of college and move to Los Angeles to pursue a record deal. Taking the Ampex tape machine with them, they continued recording songs. Nicks worked several jobs, as a hostess at Bob's Big Boy, a waitress at Clementine's and as a cleaning lady for her record producer, Keith Olsen, so as to support herself and Buckingham financially; they had decided that it would be best for him not to work and to instead focus on honing his guitar technique. It was not long before Nicks and Buckingham met engineer and producer Keith Olsen as well as the casual entrepreneurs Ted Feigin and Lee Lasseff. These two had owned White Whale Records and more recently started a production company called Anthem Records. Buckingham and Nicks played some of their music for Olsen, Feigin and Lasseff and the three were impressed with what they heard. Soon after that, Lasseff was able to secure a distribution deal with Polydor. Nicks discusses this series of events in an interview with The Island Ear in 1994:

Waddy Wachtel was one of the musicians hired to assist in recording the album. He discusses his relationship with producer Keith Olsen, as well as his relationship with Nicks and Buckingham, on his website:

Promotion
In 1973, Nicks spent $111 ($ in  dollars) on a white blouse for the cover shoot, but the photographer, Jimmy Wachtel, and Buckingham coerced Nicks to take her top off when shooting the cover. Nicks later recounted:

Despite their efforts, Buckingham Nicks was virtually ignored by the promotional staff at Polydor Records. Thanks, however, to airplay by several Birmingham, Alabama disc jockeys, the album got well-received exposure during the WJLN-FM progressive rock evening hours, and the duo managed to cultivate a relatively small and concentrated fan base in that market. Elsewhere in the country, the album did not prove to be commercially successful and was soon deleted from the label's catalog. Disheartened, Nicks and Buckingham would spend much of the rest of 1973 continuing to work outside of the music industry to pay rent, with manager Martin Pichinson releasing them from their management contract.

However, shortly after the album's release, Mick Fleetwood, while evaluating recording studios, heard "Frozen Love" played back through studio monitors at Sound City by Keith Olsen. Fleetwood would go on to invite the duo to join his band, Fleetwood Mac, on New Year's Eve 1974. Later, Buckingham met with Fleetwood and Christine and John McVie at the Mexican restaurant El Carmen, with Nicks later joining the group after her waitress shift at Clementine's, still wearing her flapper costume.

Tour
Nicks and Buckingham went on tour that year in the American South to promote Buckingham Nicks. Bootlegged recordings from two concerts in Tuscaloosa and Birmingham, Alabama have surfaced on the internet. These tours featured early performances of "Rhiannon", "Sorcerer", and "Monday Morning", as well as "Lola (My Love)", "Frozen Love", and "Don't Let Me Down Again".

The touring band consisted of bassist Tom Moncrieff, who later played bass on Nicks' first solo album Bella Donna, and drummer Gary "Hoppy" Hodges, who played drums on the album. Waddy Wachtel also toured with the band.

Moncrieff and Hodges later formed the band Sinai 48 with a new singer-songwriter duo in 2006, marking the first reunion of any Buckingham Nicks members aside from the continued collaboration of Buckingham and Nicks.

Prospects of re-release
Despite the international success that Nicks and Buckingham later achieved, Buckingham Nicks has never been officially released on CD. It has since been widely bootlegged, including one bootleg copy titled Buckingham Nicks: Deluxe Edition from South Korea. This version adds 12 extra tracks which were all recorded by Buckingham Nicks at around the same period as the Buckingham Nicks album, but were not included on the album. A copy of this album allegedly sourced from the master tapes (as opposed to a copy taken from vinyl) has also surfaced online.

Two of the album's ten songs have been issued on CD: "Long Distance Winner" was released as part of Nicks' Enchanted box set; and "Stephanie" turned up on a promotional-only CD release by Buckingham entitled Words and Music (A Retrospective), although this was from a vinyl transfer as well. Another song from the album, "Crystal", was recorded by the revamped Fleetwood Mac for the group's 1975 breakthrough LP, Fleetwood Mac, and was also recorded by Nicks herself for the soundtrack to the 1998 film Practical Magic. "Don't Let Me Down Again" was recorded by Fleetwood Mac for their 1980 live album, as it was performed several times on tour to support the Fleetwood Mac album, along with "Frozen Love". Additionally, Buckingham performed "Stephanie" on his One Man Show tour in 2012. "Stephanie" is also featured on the accompanying live album, One Man Show. Nicks performed "Cryin' in the Night" for the first time since 1973 on her 24 Karat Gold tour in 2016.

In an interview on WRLT 100.1 Nashville from September 11, 2006, Buckingham expressed interest in seeing the album released on CD. He also suggested the possibility of a future joint Lindsey Buckingham-Stevie Nicks tour in the next few years to support the prospective re-release. Backing musicians Moncrieff and Hodges have also expressed interest in reuniting with Buckingham and Nicks for a future tour.

In an interview with NME in August 2011, Lindsey Buckingham reiterated his interest in giving the album an official CD release. Regarding the long wait, he stated: "It's been a victim of inertia. We have every intention of putting that album back out and possibly even doing something along with it." In December 2012, Nicks was hopeful that a 40th anniversary edition of Buckingham Nicks would be released in 2013, claiming that at least one unreleased song from the sessions could be included on the release.

In a December 2012 interview with CBS Local, Buckingham talks about the possibility of an official CD release in 2013:
Stevie and I have been hanging out a little bit lately, and we've been talking about that. I think that's something that would happen this year as well. Oddly enough, I hate to even say it, I think the 40th anniversary of that is next year. Jeez! Is that possible? So we've been talking about it. Of course, we've been talking about it off and on for a long time, but Stevie seems really into the idea. So yes, I would say yes.

On April 30, 2013, Nicks and Buckingham, as part of Fleetwood Mac, released Extended Play, their first new studio material since 2003's Say You Will via digital download on the iTunes Store with the four-track EP containing three new songs and one song from the Buckingham Nicks sessions ("Without You") which was a "lost" demo written during the Buckingham Nicks era, which Nicks herself had found posted on YouTube.

Track listing

Charts

Personnel
Main performers
 Lindsey Buckingham – vocals, guitars, bass guitar, percussion
 Stevie Nicks – vocals

Additional personnel
 Waddy Wachtel – guitars
 Jerry Scheff – bass guitar
 Mark Tulin – bass guitar
 Peggy Sandvig – keyboards
 Jerry Sandvic – keyboards
 Monty Stark – synthesizer
 Richard Halligan – string arrangement
 Jim Keltner – drums
 Ron Tutt – drums
 Gary "Hoppy" Hodges – drums, percussion
 Jorge Calderón – percussion

Production
Keith Olsen – producer, engineer
Lee Lasseff – executive producer
Richard Dashut – assistant engineer
Jimmy Wachtel – album design, photography

References

External links
 Buckingham Nicks Interview (February 1975)
Buckingham Nicks
 2013 Gary "Hoppy" Hodges interview on Artist Connection Podcast

 

1973 debut albums
Stevie Nicks albums
Lindsey Buckingham albums
Albums produced by Keith Olsen
Albums with cover art by Jimmy Wachtel
Polydor Records albums
Vocal duet albums
Albums recorded at Sound City Studios